Jozef Krnáč (born December 30, 1977) is a Slovak judoka. He won the silver medal in the half-lightweight (66 kg) division at the 2004 Summer Olympics.

Achievements

References

External links
 

1977 births
Living people
Slovak male judoka
Judoka at the 2004 Summer Olympics
Olympic judoka of Slovakia
Olympic silver medalists for Slovakia
Olympic medalists in judo
Medalists at the 2004 Summer Olympics
Universiade medalists in judo
Universiade bronze medalists for Slovakia
Medalists at the 1999 Summer Universiade
Medalists at the 2003 Summer Universiade
Sportspeople from Bratislava